The 2019–20 Basketball Champions League Americas season was the 13th edition of the top-tier level professional club basketball competition in the Americas and first of the Basketball Champions League Americas (BCLA) since launched by FIBA in September 2019. 

The competition began on 28 October 2019, with the group phase, and would have been concluded in April 2020. On 14 March 2020, FIBA suspended all of its competitions until further notice due to the COVID-19 pandemic. The competition resumed on 27 October 2020 with an altered format, including a single-match final in Montevideo, Uruguay, on 30 October 2020.

San Lorenzo won the last FIBA Americas League tournament. They were eliminated in the semifinals by eventual winners Quimsa, who went onto beat Flamengo 92–86 in the final to be crowned as the inaugural champions of the Basketball Champions League Americas. As champions, Quimsa qualified for the 2021 FIBA Intercontinental Cup.

Team allocation
A total of 12 teams from 7 countries will participate in the 2019–20 Basketball Champions League Americas. The participating teams were announced on 1 October 2019.

Teams
League positions after eventual playoffs of the previous season shown in parentheses.

The labels in the parentheses show how each team qualified for the place of its starting round:

 1st, 2nd, etc.: League position after Playoffs
 LDA: FIBA Americas League title holders
 CW: Preseason tournament winners
 WC: Qualified through Wild Card

Round and draw dates
The schedule of the competition is as follows.

Group phase
The 12 teams are drawn into four groups of three, while taking into account geographic location. In each group, teams play against each other home-and-away, in a round-robin format. The group winners and runners-up advance to the quarterfinals, while the remaining team in each group is eliminated. The Group phase started on 28 October and will end on 20 December 2019.

Group A

Group B

Group C

Group D

Playoffs

Bracket

Team 1 hosts games 2 and 3.

Quarterfinals

|}

Semifinals

|}

Final

Statistics
The following were the statistical leaders in the 2019–20 BCL Americas season.

Individual statistic leaders

Individual game highs

Notes

References

External links

2019–20
2019–20 in South American basketball
2019–20 in North American basketball
BCLA